Ashot Danielyan (born April 11, 1974 in Yerevan, Armenian SSR) is a retired Armenian weightlifter.

Danielyan is a two-time European champion, having won consecutive gold medals at the 1999 and 2000 European Weightlifting Championships. He also came in 13th place at the 1996 Summer Olympics.

He initially won a bronze medal in the men's super heavyweight (+105 kg) weight class at the 2000 Summer Olympics, but was stripped of the medal and suspended following a positive drug test. Danielyan would have been only the second Olympic medalist weightlifter from the independent Republic of Armenia, after Arsen Melikyan, who won an Olympic medal just days earlier.

He returned to win a silver medal at the 2003 European Weightlifting Championships and to compete at the 2004 Summer Olympics, but did not finish the contest.

After coming in second at the 2006 European Weightlifting Championships, he was disqualified once again by doping and he retired.
Career bests
 Snatch: 215 kg
 Clean and jerk: 262.5 kg
 Total: 477.5 kg in 2001 at local competition in Armenia

References

1974 births
Living people
Sportspeople from Yerevan
Armenian male weightlifters
Olympic weightlifters of Armenia
Weightlifters at the 1996 Summer Olympics
Weightlifters at the 2000 Summer Olympics
Weightlifters at the 2004 Summer Olympics
Doping cases in weightlifting
Armenian sportspeople in doping cases
Competitors stripped of Summer Olympics medals
European champions in weightlifting
European champions for Armenia
European Weightlifting Championships medalists
Ethnic Armenian sportspeople